Camille Saviola (July 16, 1950 – October 28, 2021) was an American actress and singer. She appeared in numerous films, television series, plays and musicals.

Early life
Saviola was born in The Bronx, New York City, New York, the daughter of Mary (née d'Esopo) and Michael Saviola. She grew up near Yankee Stadium and graduated from the High School of Music and Art, then attended college for one year before dropping out to get into acting. Camille became lead singer of the Margo Lewis Explosion rock band in the 1970s and was signed to a disco contract in the late 1970s.

Career
Throughout the next 25 years, Saviola would perform in theater, television, and films.  She is best known for her supporting roles, especially as Italian, Latino or Jewish characters. She also appeared in four episodes of Star Trek: Deep Space Nine as Bajoran religious leader, Kai Opaka.

In addition to her performance as Mama Maddelena in Tommy Tune's original Broadway production of Nine, Broadway audiences have seen her Matron Mama Morton in the revival of Chicago. She received a CableACE Award nomination for Best Supporting Actress in the made-for-cable movie,  Nightlife.

Personal life and death
She died from heart failure in Hackensack, New Jersey, on October 28, 2021, at the age of 71.

Awards 
 Back Stage West Garland Awards, 2007 award for her role in Zorba

Filmography

References

External links
 
 

1950 births
2021 deaths
American film actresses
American stage actresses
American television actresses
Back Stage West Garland Award recipients
People from the Bronx
Actresses from New York City
The High School of Music & Art alumni
20th-century American actresses
21st-century American actresses